The Tennessee Department of Transportation (TDOT) is the department of transportation for the State of Tennessee, with multimodal responsibilities in roadways, aviation, public transit, waterways, and railroads. The core agency mission of TDOT is to provide a safe and reliable transportation system for people, goods, and services that supports economic prosperity in Tennessee. Since 1998, TDOT has been ranked amongst the top five in the nation for quality highway infrastructure. It is primarily headquartered in downtown Nashville and operates four regional offices in Chattanooga, Jackson, Knoxville, and Nashville.

Major responsibilities
The major duties and responsibilities of TDOT are to:
 administer funding and provide technical assistance in the planning and construction of state and federal aid road programs for cities and counties;
 provide incident management on Tennessee's Interstate system through TDOT SmartWay, an intelligent transportation network of cameras and dynamic message signs;
 staff transportation management centers in the four largest urban cities in Tennessee;
  provide motorist information;
 construct and maintain 19 rest area facilities and 17 welcome centers;
 administer program for control of outdoor advertising adjacent to Interstate and state highways;
 issue and administer special permits for movement of overweight and over-dimensional vehicles;
 prepare and distribute city, county, and state road maps, aeronautical charts, and airport directories;
 promote safe driving behaviors on highways;
 provide management, technical and financial assistance, and supervision to public, private, and nonprofit public transportation agencies in the state
 administer funding and assistance in location, design, construction, and maintenance of the state's 80 public airports;
 support improvements in Tennessee's railroads and rail service;
  inspect over 19,000 bridges, 80 public airports, and all of the state's railroads;
  maintain state park roads;
 operate Reelfoot Airpark and ferry operations;
 respond to initiatives of the Tennessee Aeronautics Commission;
 provide aerial photography and mapping services to all state agencies;
 provide aircraft for state executive transportation and economic development recruiting;
 administer highway beautification programs;
 provide grants to all Tennessee counties for litter abatement and litter prevention education; and
 provide cycling trails that connect or go through state parks and natural areas.

History

Prior to 1915, the state had no central authority governing construction and maintenance of roads. The governor, legislature, other road associations, and local governments all attempted to serve these tasks, leading to a lack of planning and management. In 1915, a State Highway Commission was created to organize transportation services. The original commission consisted of six volunteer members. As responsibilities of the commission grew, this became inadequate, and in 1919 the commission was replaced with three paid members. By 1922, roads in Tennessee were behind surrounding states. Governor Austin Peay created a new Department of Highways and Public Works and appointed J.G. Creveling, Jr. as the single commissioner. Peavy also implemented a tax of two cents per gallon to fund the new department. The collapse of the banking system in 1930 resulted in significant losses for the state and led to an inability to fund the department. All of its workers had to be released. However, in 1933 the New Deal projects gave $11 million of federal money for highway projects. Diversion of federal funds and military enlistment of personnel during World War II again crippled the department. Following the war, the construction of the new Interstate Highway system brought a massive boom to the department. In 1972, due to its expanding role in all modes of transportation, it was renamed the Tennessee Department of Transportation. In the 1980s, TDOT began the $3.3 billion Better Roads Program to clear a backlog of projects and improve aging roads. In 1989, the gas tax was set at 21.40 cents per gallon to help fund this project. Through the 1990s and early 2000s, the department began working on ways to improve efficiency and involve communities.

Organization
TDOT is headed by a single commissioner who is appointed by the governor. The leadership level also includes the Deputy Commissioner, and leaders for legal, aeronautics, community relations, and legislation.  Three bureaus exist under this level. Most administrative offices operate from the TDOT headquarters in downtown Nashville, the state's capital city. There are also four regional offices across the state. Each region is further divided into districts which are then subdivided into county facilities.

The following table lists the regions, district offices, maintenance and construction offices for each region, and counties served.

Bureau of Administration
This bureau serves the administrative tasks of the department. It is further divided into the following divisions:
Division of Central Services
Division of Finance
Division of Internal Audit
Division of Human Resources
Division of Strategic Planning
Division of Information Technology
Division of Procurement and Contracts

Bureau of Environment and Planning
This bureau studies environmental effects and ensures compliance with environmental policy. It also collects and analyses data to develop long range project and safety plans. It contains the following divisions:
Environmental Division
Long Range Planning Division
Freight and Logistics Division

Bureau of Engineering
This bureau designs, constructs, and maintains the state's highway system. This Bureau is directed by the Chief Engineer.  The majority of the bureau is split into two categories: Design and Operations, with each overseen by an Assistant Chief Engineer.

The Assistant Chief Engineer of Design oversees the following divisions:
Roadway Design Division
Right of Way Division
Structures Division

The Assistant Chief Engineer of Operations is responsible for overseeing the four regional offices. They also oversee the following divisions:
Traffic Operations Division
Materials and Tests Division
Construction Division
Maintenance Division

Additionally there are three independent divisions that report directly to the Chief Engineer:
Bid Analysis and Estimating Office
Program Administration and Development Division
Strategic Transport Investments Division

Transportation system
TDOT reports the following as Tennessee's transportation system:

Highway system
Bridges: 19,500, including 8,150 state owned bridges and 11,419 locally owned bridges
Interstates: (Centerline Miles)
19 Interstate rest areas
17 Interstate and U.S. Route welcome centers
9 truck weigh stations
State highways, (Centerline Miles)
Total highways,  (Lane Miles)

Airport system
74 general aviation
5 commercial
142 heliports

Rail system

Transit system
28 transit systems serving all 95 counties

Waterways
 of main channel navigable waterways
2 ferries

Bicycle and pedestrian system
 of greenways, sidewalks, and trails
9 bicycle trails on  including a single across state trail totaling 
 of greenways, sidewalks, and trails

Funding
Funding for the state transportation system in Tennessee comes from a fund that is separate from the state's general fund which operates most of the other state agencies in Tennessee. Transportation revenues come from both federal transportation monies and from state funding resources. Those state funds come from a combination of dollars collected from gas and diesel tax revenues, titling and registration fees. Tennessee operates on a "pay as you go" system by using available revenues resulting in no debt service. Tennessee is one of three states in the nation that does not finance transportation through bonding. Critics of this mechanism claim that it inhibits the ability of the department to sufficiently complete necessary infrastructure improvements.

Controversy
In October 2016, TDOT removed the Lindsay X-LITE guardrail endcap from its list of approved devices due to concerns over safety when the device was hit at high speeds. A month later, a driver was killed in a collision with one such barrier. The victim's family subsequently received a $3,000 bill from TDOT for damage caused to the guardrail. TDOT later apologized for the bill and called it a processing error. At least three other deaths within a 15-month period were also caused by this type of device.

Leadership history
The leaders of the department and its preceding organizations have been:

References

External links
Official website
TDOT Facebook
TDOT Twitter pages
TDOT Smartway Cameras
Tennessee 511
TDOT HELP program
TDOT Civil Rights Division
Governor’s Highway Safety Office
SmartCommute
Stop Litter

Department
State departments of transportation of the United States
Transportation in Nashville, Tennessee
Transportation
1915 establishments in Tennessee
Government agencies established in 1915